Karl Theophil Christian Aletter (8 July 1906 – 29 March 1991) was a German rower who competed in the 1928 Summer Olympics and in the 1932 Summer Olympics.

Aletter was born in Mannheim in 1906.

In 1928 he was part of the German boat which placed fifth after being eliminated in the quarter-finals of the eight event. Four years later he won the silver medal as member of the German boat in the coxless fours competition. He was also part of the German boat which eliminated in the repechage of the eight event.

He was later a medical doctor in Kaiserslautern, and the deputy chairman of the German Rowing Association. He died in Kaiserslautern on 29 March 1991.

References

1906 births
1991 deaths
Olympic rowers of Germany
Rowers at the 1928 Summer Olympics
Rowers at the 1932 Summer Olympics
Olympic silver medalists for Germany
Olympic medalists in rowing
German male rowers
Medalists at the 1932 Summer Olympics
Sportspeople from Mannheim